Molkhatavi (also Romanized as Molkhaţāvī; also known as Molḩaţāvī) is a village in Shiyan Rural District, in the Central District of Eslamabad-e Gharb County, Kermanshah Province, Iran. At the 2006 census, its population was 422, in 96 families.

References 

Populated places in Eslamabad-e Gharb County